Hartwell is an unincorporated community in Lockhart Township, Pike County, in the U.S. state of Indiana.

History
An old variant name of the community was called Cabel. A post office called Cabel was established in 1898, and remained in operation until 1903.

Geography

References

Unincorporated communities in Pike County, Indiana
Unincorporated communities in Indiana